Kerremansia is a genus of beetle in the family Buprestidae. , it is monospecific, consisting of the species Kerremansia paradoxa.

References

Monotypic Buprestidae genera